Patrick Webb (born 10 March 1959) is the Alexander McFarlane Professor of Nutrition at the Friedman School of Nutrition Science and Policy at Tufts University. He was Dean for Academic Affairs from 2005 to 2014.

Biography
Patrick Webb holds an endowed chair at the Friedman School, the only self-governing graduate school of nutrition in the United States. He also holds appointments at the Fletcher School of Law and Diplomacy, Tufts University, at the Patan Academy of Health Sciences in Kathmandu, Nepal, and at the University of Hohenheim, Stuttgart, Germany. He has served since 2014 as Technical Adviser to the Global Panel on Agriculture and Food Systems for Nutrition. Webb was previously Chief of Nutrition for the United Nations World Food Programme (WFP) from 2003 to 2005, and a Research Fellow at the International Food Policy Research Institute from 1989 through 1994.

A British citizen, Patrick Webb holds an undergraduate degree in geography from Sussex University, a master's degree from the Centre for West Africa Studies at the University of Birmingham, and a Doctor of Philosophy degree in geography from the University of Birmingham. He was elected as a Fellow of the Royal Geographical Society in 1984. He attended The Blue School, Wells in Somerset from 1971 to 1979.

Webb is considered to be one of the world's most influential voices in the fields of food policy, climate change, and nutrition, including as these relate to the domain of humanitarian intervention. He is also a widely known authority on food security, agriculture and nutrition policies, and food assistance. He led the United States Agency for International Development's review of food aid quality from 2009 to 2021, served on the United Nations' Hunger Task Force from 2003 through 2005, was Director for the USAID-supported Feed the Future Nutrition Innovation Lab, 2010–2020, and is currently directing the Food Systems for Nutrition Innovation Lab (2021-2026).

Webb has been a board member for the Nevin Scrimshaw International Nutrition Foundation, the Quarterly Journal of International Agriculture, the Scientific Advisory Council of Biodiversity International, the Undernutrition steering committee of the Sackler Institute of Nutrition Science Research at the New York Academy of Sciences, the Advisory Group on Agriculture and Nutrition for the Millennium Villages Project, and of Food Security. He was in North Korea for the 2004 survey of nutrition, health and mortality, on the ground in Aceh after the 2004 tsunami, as well as in Haiti after the 2010 earthquake. He was a member of the Maternal and Child Nutrition Study Group that oversaw the 2013 Lancet Series on nutrition. Webb was part of the WHO/UNICEF Technical expert advisory group on nutrition monitoring (TEAM), a member of the Research Committee of the Consortium of Universities for Global Health, a Founding Member of the Society for Implementation Science in Nutrition (SISN), and a Council Member of the Independent Science and Partnership Council (ISPC) of the Consultative Group on International Agriculture Research (CGIAR).. He served as Vice Chair of the European Commission's High Level Expert Group on Science-Policy Interfaces for Food System Transformation (2020-2022). Most recently, he was appointed in 2021 to the Steering Committee of the High Level Panel of Experts of the Committee on World Food Security, and was named in 2022 as a Commissioner for the second Eat-Lancet Commission on Planetary Health Diets.

Publications
Webb has authored around 200 peer-reviewed journal articles, as well as multiple books and book chapters. His 1994 book on Famine and Food Security in Ethiopia: Lessons for Africa. Chichester, UK: John Wiley, co-authored with Joachim von Braun, was reviewed in the New Scientist under the title,"A hard row to hoe" by Michael Cross on 24 September 1994. The reviewer wrote that "not many academic books can move a reviewer to tears. This one did."

Webb's subsequent book from 1999 on Famine in Africa: Causes, Responses and Prevention. Baltimore, MD: Johns Hopkins University Press was reviewed as "among the best of primers on current knowledge on famine prevention, market integration and malfunction, and household food security" by the Humanitarian Times, 17 Feb 1999. He has also pursued published research on broader public health issues, including tobacco use, HIV/AIDS
, and child care practices. His current research is focused on how diets and food systems interact with climate change, ecological degradation and social justice concerns. Patrick is now a thought leader in the domains that link human and planetary health.

Recent noteworthy publications include:
 
 
 
 
 
 
 
 
  
 
 

Select Op-Eds/Interviews
donor-and-why-that-might-not-be-such-a-great-thing/,  Podcast interview on Food Aid in the 21st Century, June 2018.
"To end malnutrition we must step up to the plate with data on what people eat", The Guardian, 16 October 2015.
"The Prize and the Price of Good Nutrition", Journal of the Institute of Medicine, December 2013.
"Feeding 9 Billion", About Harvest, 14 February 2012. 
"Somali Famine Crisis", Canadian Broadcasting Corporation, 25 July 2011.
"How far have we come on nutrition?", World Food Programme, 17 June 2011.
"Reducing Poverty Stresses Food Systems", Deutsche Welle, 11 May 2011.
"US to Supply Healthier Food to World's Hungry.", Voice of America, 21 April 2011.
"Cyclone: Q & A on international aid", The Boston Globe, 6 May 2008.
"How a Volcano Eruption Wiped Away Summer", National Public Radio, 27 October 2007.
"Loss of an egg can be tipping point for the malnourished", The Financial Times, 13 March 2006.
"The Invisible Crisis in Niger", The Globe and Mail, 26 August 2005.
"Lifeline profile", The Lancet, 15 May 2004

Video presentations/webcasts
 ,"Feed the Future Innovation Lab for Nutrition", 6 November 2015.
 , "Mapping Nutrition Innovation Lab Research: How does it all fit together?", Seminar on 'Understanding Agriculture to Nutrition Linkages: A Rapidly Moving Agenda', Washington, D.C., 30 September 2015.
 , "The Weight of the World", Chicago Council on Global Affairs 2015 Global Food Security Forum, Washington, D.C., 21 April 2015.
 , "What is Evidence", Workshop in Kathmandu, Nepal, organized by the USAID Feed the Future Nutrition Innovation Lab, 25 February 2015.
 , "Agriculture & nutrition. what do we know, and what do we still need to know?" Science Forum Bonn 2013
 , "Leontief Prize 2012 - Introduction", 4 April 2012.
 "Tackling Diets and Nutrition", Feeding the World Economist Conferences, Geneva, February 2012.
 "Haiti's Food and Nutrition Situation", Tufts University seminar, October 2011.
 Panel Discussion hosted by Doctors Without Borders at Boston Public Library, November 2010. Webcast online.
 "Policy Support for Agriculture, Nutrition and Health" Presentation on Food Insecurity, the Growing Burden of Over- and Under- Nutrition and Food Safety, 2nd International Roadmap Development Workshop, McGill University, Montreal, September 2010.
 "Implications of the World Food Price Crisis on Nutrition", 14th International Congress of Nutrition, Bangkok, October 2009.

Blogs 
 , No Time to Lose: A Wasting Reset, 4 Nov 2021 
 , Social Bridging Matters as Much as Social Distancing during these challenging Times, March 2020.
 , When Counting Things that Matter, It Matters What we Count, Global Panel on Agriculture and Food Systems for Nutrition, October 2015.
 , To end malnutrition we must step up to the plate with data on what people really eat, Global Panel on Agriculture and Food Systems for Nutrition, October 2015.
 , Climate change means just that - we must change with the climate, Global Panel on Agriculture and Food Systems for Nutrition, September 2015.
 , Meeting SDG targets through diversified high quality diets, with Jeff Waage, Global Panel on Agriculture and Food Systems for Nutrition, September 2015.
 , It's time to stop counting calories and focus on diet quality and policies that reduce malnutrition, Global Panel on Agriculture and Food Systems for Nutrition, September 2015.
 , Finances are necessary for development, but they are not sufficient, Global Panel on Agriculture and Food Systems for Nutrition, July 2015.
 , Tragedy in Nepal highlights the need to address fragile institutions, Global Panel on Agriculture and Food Systems for Nutrition, April 2015.
 , Why nutrition must feature prominently in the post-2015 Sustainable Development Goals, Global Panel on Agriculture and Food Systems for Nutrition, March 2015.

References

1959 births
Living people
Tufts University faculty
British nutritionists
The Fletcher School at Tufts University faculty
Alumni of the University of Birmingham